Rose Bay may refer to:


Places
 Rose Bay, New South Wales, Australia, a suburb of Sydney
 Rose Bay, Tasmania, Australia, a suburb of Hobart
 Rose Bay, Nova Scotia, a community in Canada

Schools
 Rose Bay Secondary College, Dover Height, New South Wales
 Rose Bay High School, Rose Bay, Tasmania

Other uses
 Rose Bay Water Airport, Rose Bay, New South Wales

See also
Rosebay, a common name for several plants